The United States women's national American football team represents the United States in international women's American football competitions. It is currently ranked no.1 in the IFAF. It is controlled by USA Football and is recognized by the International Federation of American Football (IFAF).

History
The original 45 women to compete for the USA played in the 2010 IFAF Women's World Championship in Stockholm, Sweden. They defeated Canada (66–0) for their first World Championship.

Team USA competed at the 2013 IFAF Women's World Championship, where they took their second title after beating Canada 64–0.

Team USA competed at the 2017 IFAF Women's World Championship, where they took their third title after beating Canada 41–16.

2010 Roster

2013 Roster

2017 Roster

See also

American football
American football in the United States
Women's Football in the United States
IFAF Women's World Championship
National Football League

References

Women's national American football teams
American football
American football in the United States
2010 establishments in the United States
American football teams established in 2010
National sports teams established in 2010